George G. "Chick" Evans (June 18, 1901 – November 23, 1976) was an American football, basketball, and baseball coach and college athletics administrator. He served as the head football coach at Northern Illinois University from 1929 to 1954, compiling a record of 132–70–20. Evans was also the head basketball coach at Northern Illinois from 1929 to 1940, tallying a mark of 125–93, and served three stints at head baseball coach at the school (1930–1934, 1937–1944, 1946–1947), amassing a record of 118–115–3. Evans was the athletic director at Northern Illinois from 1929 to 1968. His 132 wins are the most of any head coach in the Northern Illinois Huskies football program's history.

A native of El Paso, Illinois, Evans attended the University of Illinois, where was a member of the 1918 Illinois Fighting Illini football team led by head coach Robert Zuppke. He then moved on to the now-defunct Des Moines University in Des Moines, Iowa, which was later acquired by the University of Sioux Falls; this should not be confused with the present Des Moines University. At Des Moines, Evans won 11 varsity letters and captained teams in four different sports directed by head coach Harry M. Bell.

Evans began his coaching career at Boone High School in Boone, Iowa, where he spent four years before moving to DeKalb High School in DeKalb, Illinois for one year before becoming head football coach and athletic director of what was then Northern Illinois State Teachers College in 1929. As athletic director and coach, Evans oversaw Northern’s growth from a teacher’s college to a major university.

Evans later earned a master's degree from Columbia University. He died on November 23, 1976, at Kearney-Mesa Convalesclent Hospital in San Diego, California after a short illness. Evans and his wife, Venus, had moved there following his retirement as athletic director at Northern Illinois in 1968.

Chick Evans Field House, former home of the Huskies basketball team, is named for him.

Head coaching record

College football

References

1901 births
1976 deaths
Basketball coaches from Illinois
Des Moines Tigers football players
Illinois Fighting Illini football players
Northern Illinois Huskies athletic directors
Northern Illinois Huskies baseball coaches
Northern Illinois Huskies football coaches
Northern Illinois Huskies men's basketball coaches
High school basketball coaches in Illinois
High school basketball coaches in Iowa
High school football coaches in Illinois
High school football coaches in Iowa
Columbia University alumni
People from El Paso, Illinois
Players of American football from Illinois